Pasir Raja is a state constituency in Johor, Malaysia, that is represented in the Johor State Legislative Assembly.

History

Polling districts
According to the gazette issued on 24 March 2018, the Pasir Raja constituency has a total of 13 polling districts.

Representation history

Election results

References 

Johor state constituencies